Sheridan Park is a municipal park in the city of Cudahy, Wisconsin. Situated on the shore of Lake Michigan, the park has trees, shrubs, and other plants native to this region of Wisconsin.

History

The mayor of Cudahy, Wisconsin in 1913, Christ Woehsner, believed that a public park should be built on the shore of Lake Michigan. In a letter, he expressed his deep appreciation for the beauty that the area offered. The letter led to the purchase of land near the shore of Lake Michigan from the landowner, Patrick Cudahy. In 1914, the Public Park of Cudahy became an official park. In 1920, the name was changed to Sheridan Park in memory of Major-General Philip Henry Sheridan.

Natural history
Sheridan Park contains distinct natural areas. There are open fields, wooded areas, bluffs, beaches, and a pond. The area along the bluff contains plant species native to this part of Wisconsin.

Recreation
Adjacent to Lake Michigan, the park contains baseball/softball fields, basketball courts, tennis courts, a swimming pool, a children's playground, a picnic area, part of the Oak Leaf Trail, and a pond.

Flora and fauna
 Fish: largemouth bass, panfish, Northern pike
 Birds: Canada geese, mallards

 Trees and plants: birch, red pine, spruce, staghorn sumac, red osier dogwood, rough-stemmed goldenrod, cattails, dandelion

References

Parks in Wisconsin
1914 establishments in Wisconsin